Yapar-Yanbekovo (Yappar-Yänbäk) is a rural locality (a village) in Imay-Karmalinsky Selsoviet, Davlekanovsky District, Bashkortostan, Russia. The population was 79 as of 2010. There is 1 street.

Geography 
Yapar-Yanbekovo is located 42 km east of Davlekanovo (the district's administrative centre) by road. Novomryasovo is the nearest rural locality.

References 

Rural localities in Davlekanovsky District